Eveleigh may refer to:

Places
Eveleigh, New South Wales, an inner-city suburb of Sydney

People with the surname
Dennis G. Eveleigh
Edward Eveleigh
John Eveleigh (disambiguation), several people
Nicholas Eveleigh
William Eveleigh

See also
Eve Leigh
Eveleigh Railway Workshops, heritage-listed railway yards in Sydney, Australia
Eveleigh Street, one of the boundary streets of The Block (Sydney), an Aboriginal housing estate 
Everleigh (disambiguation)